Mandai is a planning area located in the North Region of Singapore, famously known for being the access point of the Singapore Zoo and Night Safari.

The Mandai Crematorium and Columbarium, the largest crematorium and columbarium in Singapore, is also located in Mandai planning area. Other features include the Sembawang Hot Springs and Sembawang Golf Course.

In 2012, a new river-themed park, River Safari, opened beside the Singapore Zoo and Night Safari. Mandai is also slated to house the Bird Paradise by Q2 2023.

Etymology and history
Mandai Road was cut in 1855. The name Mandai appears in the Franklin and Jackson Plan of Singapore (1828) as a river indicated as "R. Mandi". There was also a reference of a hill called Bukit Mandai which appears as “Bt. Mandai” in the olden maps. The name is said to come from a Malay tree called "pokok Mandai". Others suggest that “Mandai” might be a corruption of mandi, meaning “bathe” in Malay, as the river could have been used for this purpose.

Military training
Parts of Mandai are commonly used as military training areas as there is undeveloped land there. The following locations are used as training areas: Kwok Min, Asrama/Ulu Sembawang, Mandai Bumbong, Gali Batu and Mandai Central. Mandai Camp and Mandai West Camp are in Gali Batu, while Mandai Hill Camp and a live firing range are in Kwok Min. Mandai is also the location of Chong Pang Camp and the Sembawang Air Base.

Because of the massive makeover with the new bird park and rainforest park, all the military training areas (except Sembawang Air Base and Chong Pang Camp) will soon be moved to Lim Chu Kang and Pulau Tekong; and will be progressively cleared by 2023. MINDEF will release all the Mandai training areas for redevelopment.

Transportation
Apart from Mandai Road, the Mass Rapid Transit system's Mandai Depot, which will be used for the Thomson-East Coast Line, is located in Mandai.

References

.

 

 

 
North Region, Singapore
Places in Singapore